PBO may refer to:

Government
 Parliamentary Budget Office, in the federal government of Australia 
 Parliamentary Budget Officer, a Canadian civil servant
 Projected benefit obligation, a specially defined pension obligation under US-GAAP

Sciences 
 Lead(II) oxide (PbO)
 Zylon, or Polybenzobisoxazole, a polymer
 Piperonyl butoxide, a pesticide synergist

Places 
 Peterborough railway station (National Rail code: PBO)
 Paraburdoo Airport, Paraburdoo, Australia (IATA airport code: PBO)
 Pine Bluff Observatory, an astronomical observatory in Wisconsin, USA
 Plate Boundary Observatory, a geodetic observatory in the western United States
 Portland Bird Observatory, a wildlife observatory on the Isle of Portland, in Dorset, UK

Programming 
 Pixel buffer objects, used for asynchronous pixel transfer operations in OpenGL

People 
 Push Button Objects, a producer of experimental hip-hop
 President Barack Obama, former president of the United States

Video games 
 Packed Bohemia Object, a data file used in the war games developed by Bohemia Interactive Studio

Computing 
 Precision Boost Overdrive, a technology by AMD for processor overclocking

Other uses 
 Pinoy Box Office, a Filipino cable channel
 Public Benefit Organization, a type of charity or non-profit organization
 Paperback original, a book originally published as paperback
 Pin Bones Out, a type of fish fillet
 Philharmonia Baroque Orchestra